Mattawamkeag is a town in Penobscot County, Maine, United States, located where the Mattawamkeag River joins the Penobscot River. The population was 596 at the 2020 census. The village of Mattawamkeag is in the southwest part of the town.

Railroad history

Mattawamkeag's history is inextricably linked to the railroad.

The European & North American Railway built a track up the Penobscot River valley from Bangor and reached Mattawamkeag in 1869.  By October 1871 the line was completed from Mattawamkeag to Vanceboro, where it connected through to Saint John, New Brunswick, Canada.  The Maine Central Railroad leased the Bangor-Vanceboro E&NA in 1882 and purchased it in 1955.

In 1889 the International Railway of Maine was completed between Megantic, Quebec, and  Mattawamkeag, where it interchanged with the Maine Central.  The parent company of the International Railway, Canadian Pacific, obtained running rights from Maine Central for Mattawamkeag to Vanceboro where it regained CPR trackage in New Brunswick.  This placed Mattawamkeag on the transcontinental mainline of the Canadian Pacific, running from Saint John to Vancouver, British Columbia.  In 1974, CPR purchased the Mattawamkeag-Vanceboro railway tracks from Maine Central.  In 1988, CPR transferred trackage east of Megantic to its subsidiary Canadian Atlantic Railway.  In 1994, Canadian Atlantic was sold, with the line running through Mattawamkeag being purchased by J. D. Irving and is now operated as the Eastern Maine Railway.

Maine Central was purchased by Guilford Transportation Industries in 1981 and became part of Guilford Rail System, which is now named Pan Am Railways.  Mattawamkeag is the eastern terminus of PAR, running west to upstate New York through the states of Maine, New Hampshire and Massachusetts.

Historic building

The George W. Smith Homestead (1874) in Mattawamkeag is listed on the National Register of Historic Places.

Geography

Demographics

2010 census

As of the census of 2010, there were 687 people, 317 households, and 197 families living in the town. The racial makeup of the town was 98.0% White, 0.1% African American, 0.9% Native American, 0.1% Asian, 0.1% from other races, and 0.7% from two or more races. Hispanic or Latino of any race were 0.6% of the population.

There were 317 households, of which 20.2% had children under the age of 18 living with them, 47.6% were married couples living together, 8.8% had a female householder with no husband present, 5.7% had a male householder with no wife present, and 37.9% were non-families. 31.5% of all households were made up of individuals, and 12.9% had someone living alone who was 65 years of age or older. The average household size was 2.17 and the average family size was 2.66.

The median age in the town was 50.4 years. 15.1% of residents were under the age of 18; 5.9% were between the ages of 18 and 24; 18% were from 25 to 44; 41.5% were from 45 to 64; and 19.5% were 65 years of age or older. The gender makeup of the town was 50.9% male and 49.1% female.

2000 census

As of the census of 2000, there were 825 people, 338 households, and 234 families living in the town.  The population density was 22.0 people per square mile (8.5/km2).  There were 393 housing units at an average density of 10.5 per square mile (4.1/km2).  The racial makeup of the town was 98.06% White, 0.36% Native American, and 1.58% from two or more races. Hispanic or Latino of any race were 0.12% of the population.

There were 338 households, out of which 31.1% had children under the age of 18 living with them, 58.0% were married couples living together, 7.4% had a female householder with no husband present, and 30.5% were non-families. 26.9% of all households were made up of individuals, and 13.9% had someone living alone who was 65 years of age or older.  The average household size was 2.44 and the average family size was 2.96.

In the town, the population was spread out, with 25.2% under the age of 18, 5.1% from 18 to 24, 28.0% from 25 to 44, 24.6% from 45 to 64, and 17.1% who were 65 years of age or older.  The median age was 40 years. For every 100 females, there were 95.5 males.  For every 100 females age 18 and over, there were 95.3 males.

The median income for a household in the town was $23,403, and the median income for a family was $32,000. Males had a median income of $27,857 versus $19,063 for females. The per capita income for the town was $12,573.  About 7.8% of families and 12.9% of the population were below the poverty line, including 12.3% of those under age 18 and 12.0% of those age 65 or over.

Notable people

 Mary F. Cahill, state legislator 
 Steve Clifford, professional basketball coach

References

External links
Mattawamkeag Wilderness Park

Towns in Penobscot County, Maine
Towns in Maine